Botevo may refer to the following villages in Bulgaria, most named after Hristo Botev:

 Botevo, Montana Province
 Botevo, Varna Province
 Botevo, Vidin Province
 Botevo, Vratsa Province
 Botevo, Yambol Province